Stéphanie Trognon (born 18 October 1976) is a French footballer who played as a midfielder for French club ASPTT Strasbourg of the Division 1 Féminine.

International career

Stéphanie Trognon represented France 7 times. Trognon was also part of the French team at the 1997 European Championships.

Coaching career

Since retiring from professional football Trognon has become the coach of the FC Vendenheim.

References

1976 births
Living people
French women's footballers
France women's international footballers
Women's association football midfielders
Division 1 Féminine players